Randolph H. Runden (August 27, 1897 – December 15, 1964) was an American farmer and politician.

Born in Chicago, Illinois, Runden received his bachelor's degree from University of Wisconsin–Madison and was a farmer in the town of Norway in Racine County, Wisconsin. Runden served on the Town of Norway Board and was town chairman. He also served on the Racine County Board of Supervisors and was chairman of the board. Runden was also commissioner of the Norway-Dover Drainage District and was a Republican. From 1941 to 1949. Runden served in the Wisconsin State Assembly. Runden died in Racine, Wisconsin.

Notes

1897 births
1964 deaths
Politicians from Chicago
People from Norway, Wisconsin
University of Wisconsin–Madison alumni
Farmers from Wisconsin
County supervisors in Wisconsin
Mayors of places in Wisconsin
Republican Party members of the Wisconsin State Assembly
20th-century American politicians